Mary Lurintha "Mary Lou" Dye (née Maycock, born June 15, 1961) is an American farmer and politician from Washington. Dye is a Republican member of the Washington House of Representatives from District 9.

Education 
In 1983, Dye earned a Bachelor of Science degree in Plant Science/Crop Management from University of Idaho. In 2018, Dye graduated from the Pacific NorthWest Economic Region (PNWER) Foundation's Legislative Energy Horizon Institute.

Career 
In 1984, Dye became an agriculture educator for the U.S. Peace Corps in Thailand, until 1986.

Dye and her husband operate a wheat farm near Pomeroy, Washington.

On May 8, 2015, Dye was appointed to the Washington House of Representatives for District 9, despite being the second choice of the Republican Precinct Committee Officers. Dye filled the vacancy left after State Representative Susan Fagan resigned on April 30, 2015 amid allegations of fraud and theft for inflating reported mileage numbers to increase the amount she received from her taxpayer-funded expense account.

On November 3, 2015, Dye won the election and became a Republican member of Washington House of Representatives for District 9, Position 1. Dye defeated Richard Lathim with 63.31% of the votes.

On November 8, 2016, as an incumbent, Dye won the election and continued serving as a member of Washington House of Representatives for District 9, Position 1. Dye defeated Jenn Goulet with 66.51% of the votes.

On November 6, 2018, as an incumbent, Dye won the election and continued serving as a member of Washington House of Representatives for District 9, Position 1. Dye defeated Jenn Goulet with 64.22% of the votes.

On November 3, 2020, as an incumbent, Dye won the election and continued serving as a member of Washington House of Representatives for District 9, Position 1. Dye defeated Brett Borden with 75.05% of the votes.

Awards 
 2020 Guardians of Small Business. Presented by NFIB.

Personal life 
Dye's husband is Roger Dye. They have three children. Dye and her family live in Pomeroy, Washington.

References

External links 
 Mart Dye at ballotpedia.org

1961 births
Living people
Republican Party members of the Washington House of Representatives
University of Idaho alumni
People from Pomeroy, Washington
21st-century American politicians
Women state legislators in Washington (state)
21st-century American women politicians